Virtual Extensible LAN (VXLAN) is a network virtualization technology that attempts to address the scalability problems associated with large cloud computing deployments. It uses a VLAN-like encapsulation technique to encapsulate OSI layer 2 Ethernet frames within layer 4 UDP datagrams, using 4789 as the default IANA-assigned destination UDP port number. VXLAN endpoints, which terminate VXLAN tunnels and may be either virtual or physical switch ports, are known as VXLAN tunnel endpoints (VTEPs).

VXLAN is an evolution of efforts to standardize on an overlay encapsulation protocol. Compared to VLAN which provides limited number of layer-2 VLANs (typically using 12-bit VLAN ID), VXLAN increases scalability up to 16 million logical networks (with 24-bit VNID) and allows for layer-2 adjacency across IP networks. Multicast or unicast with head-end replication (HER) is used to flood Broadcast, unknown-unicast and multicast traffic.

The VXLAN specification was originally created by VMware, Arista Networks and Cisco.  Other backers of the VXLAN technology include Huawei, Broadcom, Citrix, Pica8, Big Switch Networks, Cumulus Networks, Dell EMC, Ericsson, Mellanox, FreeBSD, OpenBSD, Red Hat, Joyent, and Juniper Networks.

VXLAN is officially documented by the IETF in RFC 7348. VXLAN encapsulates a MAC frame in a UDP datagram for transport across an IP network, creating an overlay network or tunnel.

Open vSwitch is an example of a software-based virtual network switch that supports VXLAN overlay networks.

See also 

 Distributed Overlay Virtual Ethernet (DOVE)
 Ethernet VPN (EVPN)
 GENEVE, an industry effort to unify both VXLAN and NVGRE technologies
 Generic Routing Encapsulation (GRE)
 IEEE 802.1ad, an Ethernet networking standard, also known as provider bridging, Stacked VLANs, or simply QinQ.
 NVGRE, a similar competing specification
 Overlay Transport Virtualization (OTV)
 Virtual LAN (VLAN)
 Layer 2 Tunneling Protocol (L2TP)

References

External links 
 VXLAN Deep Dive: Part 1 and Part 2, November 2012, by Joe Onisick

Tunneling protocols